Yi'an, or T'ai-an, is a town and the county seat of Yi'an County, Heilongjiang, China.

Township-level divisions of Heilongjiang